René Debenne (26 April 1914 – 16 February 2012) was a French racing cyclist. He won stage 13a of the 1935 Giro d'Italia.

References

External links
 

1914 births
2012 deaths
French male cyclists
French Giro d'Italia stage winners
Sportspeople from Colombes
Cyclists from Île-de-France